A night shift is either a group of workers night working, or the period in which they work.

Night Shift, Nightshift, or The Night Shift may also refer to:

Film, TV, and video games

Film
 Night Shift (1944 film), a French-Italian film directed by Jean Faurez
 Night Shift (1982 film), an American film, one of Ron Howard's earliest directorial efforts
 The Night Shift (film), a 2011 American zombie comedy film
 Night Shift (2018 film), a Russian comedy film
 Nightshift (film), a 2020 Philippine horror film

Television
 Night Shift (Hong Kong TV series), a Hong Kong crime thriller
 Night Shift (Irish TV programme), a 2006–2008 Irish musical TV programme broadcast on Channel 6
 Night Shift (UK TV series), a British TV series shown late at night on ITV  in 1992–1994 and again in 1998
 The Night Shift (TV series), a 2014–2017 American medical drama TV series
 The Nightshift (TV programme), a 2010–2015 British TV programme broadcast on STV in Scotland
 "The Night Shift" (Brooklyn Nine-Nine), a TV episode
 General Hospital: Night Shift, a primetime soap opera airing on SOAPnet during the summers of 2007 and 2008
 The Night Shift, or Næturvaktin, an Icelandic TV series
 "Nightshift", a 1998 episode of dinnerladies on BBC
 "Nightshift", a 2014 episode of the Sky Arts series Playhouse Presents

Video games
Night Shift (video game), a 1990 computer game designed and published by LucasArts

Music
 Night Shift (band), a Serbian rock band
 The Nightshift, a 1960s band with Jeff Beck
 Night Shift (album), a 1976 album by the rock band Foghat
 Nightshift (album), a 1985 album by the Commodores
 "Nightshift" (song), from the album
 "Night Shift" (Jon Pardi song), 2016
 "Night Shift" (Lucy Dacus song), 2017
 The Night Shift (concert), a concert series by the Orchestra of the Age of Enlightenment
 Night Shift, a 2007 album by Danish band Turboweekend
 "Night Shift", a 1976 song by Bob Marley & The Wailers from Rastaman Vibration
 "Nightshift", a 1981 song by Siouxsie & The Banshees from Juju
 "Nightshift", a 1998 song by South Park Mexican from Hustle Town
 "Night Shift", a 2012 song by The Birthday Massacre released with Hide and Seek

Print media
 Night Shift (comics), a fictional team of supervillains in the Marvel Universe
 Nightshift (magazine), a free monthly music magazine in Oxford, England
 Night Shift (short story collection), a 1978 collection by Stephen King
 Night Shift, a 1942 novel by Maritta Wolff

Other uses
Night Shift (software), an iOS and macOS software feature

See also
Shift work (disambiguation)